Hut 7 was a wartime section of the Government Code and Cypher School (GC&CS) at Bletchley Park tasked with the solution of Japanese naval codes such as JN4, JN11, JN40, and JN-25. The hut was headed by Hugh Foss who reported to Frank Birch, the head of Bletchley's Naval section.

Hut 7 supplied cryptanalysts and linguists to Bletchley's front line station the Far East Combined Bureau (FECB) at Hong Kong, then Singapore, then Anderson Station (Colombo, Ceylon, now Sri Lanka), then Allidina School in Kilindini, Kenya before moving back to Colombo.

Bletchley co-operated with the US Navy Code and Signals Section known as OP-20-G in Washington D.C., and with FRUMEL in Melbourne (although the reciprocal cooperation from Fabian at FRUMEL was limited and reluctant); 
see Central Bureau and FRUMEL.

Pre-War origins
Among the first challenges was overcoming the special kana and romaji Morse code system used by the Japanese.  GC&CS began breaking Japanese diplomatic traffic in the early 1920s.  GC&CS subsequently attacked the Naval Reporting Code, and General Operations Code.

The section was headed by William "Nobby" Clarke with Harry Shaw and Ernest Hobart-Hampden.  These were later joined by Eric Nave, seconded from the Royal Australian Navy, John Tiltman, and Hugh Foss.

GC&CS operated the Far East Combined Bureau, the codebreaking and intercept station in Hong Kong prewar, which during the war moved to Singapore, Colombo and Kilindini.

WWII expansion
Potential linguists and cryptographers were recruited from the University of Cambridge and the University of Oxford by referral through people like the Revd Martin Charlesworth, A.D. Lindsay, Dr C. P. Snow, and Theodore Chaundy. Candidates were interviewed and approved by a board that included Colonel Tiltman.  Successful candidates received a final interview at Bletchley by a senior representative of their section.

At the outset of World War II, Britain had few Japanese linguists and conventional wisdom held that it would require two years to produce qualified linguists for the war effort. In February 1942, an accelerated program was established to train linguists to assist with Japanese signals intelligence.  Candidates were put through an intensive six-month course taught by Captain Oswald Tuck, RN. The course was taught in various locations in Bedford including the Gas Company.  The course produced linguists for the Navy, Army, Air Force, and Foreign Office.  Some of the linguists were sent on to Bletchley, while others were sent to London to work with Captain Malcolm Kennedy.

Later cryptanalysts did not require linguistic training, so could be recruited and put to work directly. Some of these cryptanalysts received a shorter version of the Japanese language course.

The Japanese Naval Section was originally stationed at the Elmer School near Bletchley. By August 1942, the unit consisted of 40 people.  The unit was moved inside Bletchley Park in September and again in February 1943 to Hut 7.  The unit expanded (or moved) later to Block B.

The wooden structure of the hut was demolished sometime between 1948 and 1954.

Contributions
In addition to code books and manual ciphers, the Imperial Japanese Navy also utilized electric cipher machines known as JADE and CORAL using the same technology as PURPLE.  While OP-20-G took the lead on these systems, Bletchley provided some contributions.

In 1921, GC&CS was able to provide insight into the Japanese bargaining position at the Washington Naval Conference of the nine major powers and limit their ambitions.

Pre-war accomplishments were helped tremendously by the death of Emperor Taishō in 1926.  The repetition of the formal announcement provided GC&CS with cribs into almost every code in use.  Later in 1934, Foss was able to break an early Japanese cipher machine.

Tiltman provided the major break into JN25 in 1939.

In early 1942, decrypts from Anderson gave advance warning of Vice Admiral Nagumo's Indian Ocean raid including a planned attack on Colombo.  The warning allowed the British to limit damage, improve opposition, and evacuate the fleet and the cryptanalysts from Colombo to Kilindini.

In May 1945, the team at HMS Anderson successfully broke a message in JN25 that provided details of a supply convoy going from Singapore to the Andaman Islands.  This message provided details that led to the sinking of the Japanese cruiser Haguro in the Battle of the Malacca Strait.

List of Hut 7 personnel
The following people served in Hut 7, HMS Anderson, and Kilindini:

 Sidney Abramson, translator at Anderson
 Brian Augarde, mathematician, sub-section chief at Bletchley, worked on JN11
 Peter Barnett, translator at Anderson
 Lieutenant-Commander Barnham, translator at Kilindini
 Charles Bawden, linguist at Anderson
 Ted Biggs, ex-diplomat, Kilindini, Anderson, and Melbourne
 Gerry Brennan, cryptanalyst at Bletchley, worked on JN40
 Leo Brouwer, Lieutenant-Commander RNN; a Japanese linguist from Kamer 14 (Java); Colombo, Kilindini, Hut 7
 Maurice Burnett, linguist at Anderson
 John Catlow, linguist at Anderson
 Dudley Cheke, Kilindini
 Jon Cohen, linguist/cryptanalyst temporarily assigned to Diplomatic Section, later to Bletchley, and Kilindini
 Lieutenant-Commander E.H. Colgrave
 George Curnock, translator at Singapore, Anderson and Kilindini
 Brenda Scott Curtis, cryptanalyst Bletchley Park
 Wynn Davies, translator/cryptanalyst at Bletchley and Kilindini
 Denny Denham, translator at Anderson
 Hugh Denham, cryptanalyst at Bletchley, Kilindini, and Anderson, worked on JN25
 Alan Douglas, linguist temporarily assigned to Diplomatic Section
 John English, sub-section chief at Bletchley
 Harry Field, Anderson
 Frederick  (Freddy) Freeborn, head of the Hollerith index section in Hut 7 (later Block C), ex-head of BTM's Letchworth factory.   
 Forman, Kilindini
 Hugh Foss, head of Hut 7
 Daphne Goff, Foreign Office, Hollerith operator
 Diana Goff, Foreign Office, Hollerith operator
 Christy Maggie Mackinnon, Foreign Office, Hollerith operator
 Capt. Joshua David Goldberg, Japanese codebreaker
 Sergeant Harris-Jones, assistant translator at Bletchley
 Hubert Eustace Hooper, linguist at Anderson
 George Hunter, linguist at Anderson
 Hayden John, cryptanalyst, ran JN40 group at Bletchley
 Lieutenant-Commander Bruce Keith, translator at Bletchley
 Sub Lieutenant Anthony Richard Michael Kelly (RNVR), linguist - Japanese
 Johnnie Lambert, cryptanalyst at Bletchley and Anderson
 Peter Laslett, cryptanalyst at Bletchley, worked on JN11
Elsie May Lait, Hut 7 FO civilian
 Peter Lawrence, translator at Anderson
 John Lloyd, language instructor at Bletchley
 Michael Loewe, linguist/cryptanalyst at Bletchley and Kilindini
 Alexander Murray Macbeath, cryptanalyst at Bletchley.
 John MacInnes, cryptanalyst at Kilindini
 Norman Mahalski (later Scott), mathematician / cryptanalyst at Bletchley and Anderson, worked on JN11 and JN25
 Commander McIntyre RN, translator, at Kilindini and ran JN25 group at Bletchley
 Joan Meikle, Foreign Office, Bletchley
 Alan Merry, translator at Melbourne, Kilindini, and ran JN40 group at Anderson
 Milner, support at Anderson
 George Mitchell, Anderson
 Alexander Sandy Morris, Anderson
 Lieutenant Commander Philip L Nicol RN, linguistics and Cryptanalyst - Japanese at Bletchley.
 Commander Parsons RN, translator at Kilindini
 Jimmy Pollard, cryptanalyst at Bletchley, worked on JN40
 Pond, support at Anderson
 Fred Ponting, cryptanalyst at Bletchley, worked on JN11
 John Sharman, cryptanalyst at Anderson and Kilindini
 John Silkin, linguist at Anderson
 Stanton, cryptanalyst at Kilindini
 John Sutcliffe, cryptanalyst at Bletchley
 Patrick Taylor, mathematician at Bletchley
 Wilf Taylor, linguist at Anderson
 Captain Dick Thatcher RN, worked on JN 25 at Bletchley, was at FECB Hong Kong
 Brian Townend, cryptanalyst at Kilindini, contributed a break into JN40
 Richard Wolfe, Anderson
 Leslie Yoxall, cryptanalyst at Bletchley, previously working in Hut 8

References

Cryptography organizations
Bletchley Park
Buildings and structures in Milton Keynes
Huts